Matko Djarmati (born 24 February 1982) is a Croatian  manager.Uefa Pro coach who currently assistant manager of Indian Super League club Chennaiyin FC.

Club career
Djarmati previously played for NK Rijeka in the Croatian Prva HNL and Skënderbeu in Kategoria Superiore. He also played for Lamia F.C. in the Greek Gamma Ethniki.

He finished one of the best Croatian schools for football (HNK Rijeka), and started his professional career in the same club. With HNK Rijeka he played some international games, part of UEFA league. After that, he played in Croatian second Division and one year in Greece. From 2009 until now Djarmati has played in Kategoria Superiore.

Dinamo Tirana
On 2 September 2012, Djarmati extended his contract with Dinamo Tirana for another one season, keeping him at the club until the end of 2012–13 season.

Tërbuni
On 22 March 2015, Djarmati received the first red-card of his career for punching a player during the 0–3 away win against Ada. He was banned for five matches, and returned in the first team for the league match against Adriatiku on 9 May. In this match, Djarmati started and played full-90 minutes as Tërbuni didn't go more and a goalless draw.

Kastrioti
On 13 July 2015, Djarmati returned to Kastrioti after almost five years by signing a one-year contract. He was given number 25 for the 2015–16 season. About this transfer, Djarmati said: "I'm very happy that i will be part of Kastrioti for the new season. I'm optimist that this team will be a rival to be promoted in Kategoria Superiore next season".

Djarmati started the season by playing only 25 minutes in team's opening match of the season against Erzeni on 12 September 2015, helping his side to start the season in the right way with a 2–1 win. He scored his first goal of the season one week later in the second match of the league, netting the first goal of his team that equaled the 0–2 disadvantage into a 2–2 draw against Adriatiku. He appeared again as a second-half substitute. In the beginning of September Djarmati suffered an injury that kept him outside of the field for three weeks.

On 30 September, Djarmati was again on the score sheet as he scored a decisive goal in a 2–1 loss against Besëlidhja in the returning leg of the first round of 2015–16 Albanian Cup, helping Kastrioti to pass the round with the away goal rule after winning the first match 1–0. In his first match as a starter on 7 November, Djarmati scored a brace as Kastrioti thrashed 4–1 Burreli in the week 8 of the league.

Career statistics

Club
As of 12 November 2015

Honours

Club
Tërbuni 
 Kategoria e Parë: Runner-up 2014–15

Personal life
Djarmati is married to Gerta Heta, a well-known Albanian singer and television moderator. The couple married in 2010. Their baby daughter, Luna, was born one year later.

Notes

References

External links

1982 births
Living people
Footballers from Rijeka
Croatian people of Albanian descent
Association football midfielders
Croatian footballers
HNK Rijeka players
NK Istra players
NK Pomorac 1921 players
NK Hrvatski Dragovoljac players
PAS Lamia 1964 players
KF Skënderbeu Korçë players
KS Kastrioti players
Besa Kavajë players
Long An FC players
FK Dinamo Tirana players
KF Tërbuni Pukë players
Croatian Football League players
Kategoria Superiore players
V.League 1 players
Kategoria e Parë players
Croatian expatriate footballers
Expatriate footballers in Greece
Croatian expatriate sportspeople in Greece
Expatriate footballers in Albania
Croatian expatriate sportspeople in Albania
Expatriate footballers in Vietnam
Croatian expatriate sportspeople in Vietnam
Croatian expatriate sportspeople in India